The 1979–80 season of the European Cup football club tournament was won by holders Nottingham Forest in the final against Hamburg. The winning goal was scored by John Robertson, who drilled the ball into the corner of the Hamburg net from outside the penalty area. Nottingham Forest remain the only side to have won the European Cup more times than their domestic top flight.

Preliminary round

|}

First leg

Second leg

Dundalk won 3–1 on aggregate.

Bracket

First round

|}

First leg

Second leg

Nottingham Forest won 3–1 on aggregate.

Argeș Pitești won 3–2 on aggregate.

BFC Dynamo won 4–1 on aggregate.

Servette won 4–2 on aggregate.

Dukla Prague won 4–3 on aggregate.

Strasbourg won 6–1 on aggregate.

Ajax won 16–2 on aggregate.

Omonia won 7–3 on aggregate.

Celtic won 4–2 on aggregate.

Dundalk won 2–1 on aggregate.

Porto won 1–0 on aggregate.

Real Madrid won 3–0 on aggregate.

Hamburg won 5–1 on aggregate.

Dinamo Tbilisi won 4–2 on aggregate.

Vejle won 4–3 on aggregate.

Hajduk Split won 2–0 on aggregate.

Second round

|}

First leg

Second leg

Nottingham Forest won 4–1 on aggregate.

BFC Dynamo won 4–3 on aggregate.

Strasbourg won 2–1 on aggregate.

Ajax won 10–4 on aggregate.

Celtic won 3–2 on aggregate.

2–2 on aggregate; Real Madrid won on away goals.

Hamburg won 6–3 on aggregate.

Hajduk Split won 4–2 on aggregate.

Quarter-finals

|}

First leg

Second leg

Nottingham Forest won 3–2 on aggregate.

Ajax won 4–0 on aggregate.

Real Madrid won 3–2 on aggregate.

3–3 on aggregate; Hamburg won on away goals.

Semi-finals

|}

First leg

Second leg

Nottingham Forest won 2–1 on aggregate.

Hamburg won 5–3 on aggregate.

Final

Top scorers
The top scorers from the 1979–80 European Cup (excluding preliminary round) are as follows:

References

External links

 1979–80 All matches – season at UEFA website
 European Cup results at Rec.Sport.Soccer Statistics Foundation
 All scorers 1979–80 European Cup (excluding preliminary round) according to protocols UEFA
 1979/80 European Cup - results and line-ups (archive)

1979–80 in European football
European Champion Clubs' Cup seasons